Ken and Neal Skupski were the defending champions, but lost in the quarterfinals to Benjamin Bonzi and Antoine Hoang.

Ivan Dodig and Édouard Roger-Vasselin won the title, defeating Bonzi and Hoang in the final, 6–4, 6–3.

Seeds

Draw

Draw

References

External Links
 Main Draw

Open Sud de France
Doubles